Andrej Maslinko (born May 20, 1997) is a Macedonian professional basketball power forward for KK Pelister of the Macedonian First League.

Youth career
 2012-2013: Partizan Vodno Sans U16 team
 2013-2014: Stella Azzurra Roma (Italy) junior team
 2014-2015: Stella Azzurra Roma (Italy-Serie B), then moved to Virtus Valmontone (Italy-Serie B)
 2015-2016: Paffoni Omegna junior team

Professional career
On January 22, 2018, he was in starting five against Crvena zvezda, scoring 15 points and 5 rebounds.

External links
 Eurobasket Profile
 FIBA Europe Profile
 BeoBasket Profile

References

1997 births
Living people
Sportspeople from Skopje
Macedonian men's basketball players
Power forwards (basketball)
KK MZT Skopje players
KK Rabotnički players